The 2008 Barcelona KIA was a women's tennis tournament played on outdoor clay courts. It was the second edition of the Barcelona KIA, and was part of the Tier IV Series of the 2008 WTA Tour. It took place at the David Lloyd Club Turó in Barcelona, Spain, from 9 June through 15 June 2008. Second-seeded Maria Kirilenko won the singles title.

Finals

Singles

 Maria Kirilenko defeated  María José Martínez Sánchez, 6–0, 6–2
 It was Kirilenko's 2nd title of the year, and her 4th overall.

Doubles

 Lourdes Domínguez Lino /  Arantxa Parra Santonja defeated  Nuria Llagostera Vives /  María José Martínez Sánchez, 4–6, 7–5, 10–4

External links
 Official website
 Singles, Doubles and Qualifying Singles draws

  
Barcelona KIA
2008
2008 in Catalan sport
barcelona KIA